Mohammad Badruddoza is a politician and the former Member of Parliament of Kushtia-3.

Career
Badruddoza was elected to parliament from Kushtia-3 as a Combined opposition candidate in 1988.

Death
Badruddoza died on 30 July 2017 at Delta Medical College and Hospital, Dhaka, Bangladesh.

References

2017 deaths
4th Jatiya Sangsad members